The 74th World Science Fiction Convention (Worldcon), also known as MidAmeriCon II, was held on 17–21 August 2016 at the Bartle Hall Convention Center in Kansas City, Missouri, United States. The convention's name, by established Worldcon tradition, follows after the first MidAmeriCon, the 34th World Science Fiction Convention, held in Kansas City in 1976.

The convention was organized by Mid American Science Fiction and Fantasy Conventions, Inc., and was chaired by Ruth Lichtwardt and co-chaired by Diane Lacey.

Participants

Guests of Honor 

 artist Kinuko Y. Craft
 author Tamora Pierce
 author Michael Swanwick
 editor Patrick Nielsen Hayden
 editor Teresa Nielsen Hayden
 Pat Cadigan (toastmaster)

Programming and events

Masquerade 

The MidAmeriCon II masquerade was held on Friday, 19 August, with 34 entrants. Gregory de Danann was the Masquerade Director and the master of ceremonies was John Hertz. The judges were Tanglewyst de Holloway, Karen Schnaubelt, and Kathy Pepmiller for performance, and Jill Eastlake and Aurora Celeste for workmanship.

The winners, across four experience-based categories, were:

Young Fan division 

 Most Adorable: "Young Sherlock" by Zachary Rohwer
 More Most Adorable: "Ding" (Doctor Who) by Grayson Rohwer

Novice division 

Workmanship awards:

 Honorable Mention for Carving: "Mystogan" (Fairy Tail) by Jacob Lemon-Rogers, Jonathan Kunkee, Loren Kunkee, and Lyndsey Luther
 Honorable Mention for Puff Patterns: "Rambo Brite" by Gene Bennett
 Honorable Mention for Puppetry: "Sarabi, the Gryphon" by Ashley Bilke.
 Ashley Bilke was also awarded the Silicon Web Costumers Guild Dreamcatcher Award at this event.
 It Lights up and Spins Award: "Raymond J. Stanz, Apparition Eliminator" (Steampunk Ghostbuster) by Zachary Miles
 Best Fur Work: "Pooch" by Kathy Hinkle
 Best in Class: "Mythological Loki" by Sarah Sanders

Performance awards:

 Best Novice Humor: "Rambo Brite" by Gene Bennett
 Best in Class: "Victorian Twilight Sparkle" (My Little Pony: Friendship Is Magic) Rosemary Williams

Journeyman division 

Workmanship awards:

 Painting the Roses Red Award: "When Queens Collide" (The Red Queen from Alice in Wonderland and the Queen of the Night from Mozart's The Magic Flute) by Janine Wardale, Theresa Halbert and Thor Halbert
 Best in Class: "Cinderella" (based on artwork by Kinuko Y. Craft) by Sheryl Nance-Durst

Performance awards:

 Best Humor: "Flight of the Valkyries" by Sharon Bass, Christine Brockway, Chris O'Halloran and Sara Vanderbroek (singing).
 Best in Class: "When Queens Collide" by Janine Wardale and Theresa Halbert

Master division 

Workmanship awards:

 Honorable Mention for Beadwork: "A Paid Political Announcement" (Flash Gordon for President) by Kevin Hewett and Rebecca Hewett
 Best Execution of Concept: "Boots Upgraded" (Cyberman) by Jennifer Skwarski
 Best in Class: "Tri Morrignae" (Irish mythology) by Jennifer Old-d'Entremont, Bethany Padron and Megan McQueen

Performance awards:

 Best Master Humor: "Sharknado" by Amanda Arthur-Struss and Joe Struss
 Honored for Excellence in Presentation: "Tri Morrignae" (Irish mythology) by Jennifer Old-d'Entremont, Bethany Padron and Megan McQueen
 Best in Class: "Flights of Fantasy" (history of flight in SF literature) by Tim Morgan, Lorretta Morgan, Iain Miller, Meredith Hines and Russ Miller

Overall 

 Judges' Choice Award: "Spirits of the Tea" (based on artwork by Kinuko Y. Craft) by Sallie Abba, Greg Abba, Robert A. Cook, Rachelle Hrubetz, Leslie Roth and Tal Roth
 Best in Show: "Troll Bridge" by Susan Eisenhour, Joyce Blakesley, Isabell Robinson, Quincy Robinson, Paul Elmer, Kate Elmer, Freya Elmer, Juliet Elmer, Darrin Blom, Richard Blom and Margaret Blom

Awards 

MidAmeriCon II also presented Retro-Hugos for the calendar year 1940, on the 75th anniversary of the 3rd World Science Fiction Convention held in Denver because, having not yet been established, no Hugo Awards were presented in 1941.

2016 Hugo Awards 

The 74th World Science Fiction Convention, MidAmeriCon II, announced the winners of the 2016 Hugo Awards at a ceremony on the evening of Saturday, 20 August 2016. The ceremony was hosted by Toastmaster, Pat Cadigan, assisted by Jan Siegel. 3,130 valid final ballots were received and counted. The 2016 Hugo Award trophy base was designed by Sara Felix.

 Best Novel: The Fifth Season, by N. K. Jemisin (Orbit)
 Best Novella: "Binti", by Nnedi Okorafor (Tor.com)
 Best Novelette: "Folding Beijing", by Hao Jingfang, translated by Ken Liu (Uncanny Magazine, Jan-Feb 2015)
 Best Short Story: "Cat Pictures Please", by Naomi Kritzer (Clarkesworld, January 2015)
 Best Related Work: no award
 Best Graphic Story: The Sandman: Overture, written by Neil Gaiman, art by J.H. Williams III (Vertigo)
 Best Dramatic Presentation, Long Form: The Martian, screenplay by Drew Goddard, directed by Ridley Scott (Scott Free Productions; Kinberg Genre; TSG Entertainment; 20th Century Fox)
 Best Dramatic Presentation, Short Form: Jessica Jones: "AKA Smile", written by Scott Reynolds, Melissa Rosenberg, and Jamie King, directed by Michael Rymer (Marvel Television; ABC Studios; Tall Girls Productions; Netflix)
 Best Professional Editor, Short Form: Ellen Datlow
 Best Professional Editor, Long Form: Sheila E. Gilbert
 Best Professional Artist: Abigail Larson
 Best Semiprozine: Uncanny Magazine, edited by Lynne M. Thomas & Michael Damian Thomas, Michi Trota, and Erika Ensign & Steven Schapansky
 Best Fanzine: File 770, edited by Mike Glyer
 Best Fancast: no award
 Best Fan Writer: Mike Glyer
 Best Fan Artist: Steve Stiles

Other awards 

 John W. Campbell Award for Best New Writer: Andy Weir

Site selection 

The location was selected on 17 August 2014 by the members of the 72nd World Science Fiction Convention in London.

By the February 2014 deadline, only two committees had announced bids to host the 74th World Science Fiction Convention: "KC in 2016" for 17–21 August 2016, at the Bartle Hall Convention Center in downtown Kansas City, Missouri, and "Beijing in 2016" for 14–19 August 2016, at the China National Convention Center. Kansas City bid co-chairs Diane Lacey, Ruth Lichtwardt, and Jeff Orth represented the non-profit Mid American Science Fiction and Fantasy Conventions, Inc. Of the 758 votes cast by Loncon 3 members, Kansas City won the contest with 651 votes over Beijing with 70 votes. "None of the above" received 4 votes while other sites, including Minneapolis, Boston, Norway, Helsinki, and Sitka, Alaska, received 1 or 2 votes each. If Beijing had been selected, this would have been the first Worldcon in China and the first in mainland Asia.

See also 

 Hugo Award
 Science fiction
 Speculative fiction
 World Science Fiction Society
 Worldcon

References

External links 

 MidAmericon II official website 
 "KC in 2016" bid site 
 "Beijing in 2016" bid site
 Worldcon official website

2016 conferences
2016 in Missouri
2016 in the United States
Culture of Kansas City, Missouri
Science fiction conventions in the United States
Worldcon